At the 1988 Summer Olympics in Seoul, 20 wrestling events were contested, for all men only. There were 10 weight classes in each of the freestyle wrestling and Greco-Roman wrestling disciplines.

Medal summary

Freestyle

Greco-Roman

Medal table

Participating nations
A total of 429 wrestlers from 69 nations competed at the Seoul Games:

See also
List of World and Olympic Champions in men's freestyle wrestling
List of World and Olympic Champions in Greco-Roman wrestling

References

External links
 
 Official Olympic Report

 
1988 Summer Olympics events
O
1988